Patricia Gleščič (born 16 July 1994, in Ljubljana) is a Slovenian former competitive figure skater. She won bronze medals at the 2010 Golden Spin of Zagreb and 2011 Triglav Trophy, gold at the 2011 Istanbul Cup, and three Slovenian national titles. She qualified for the free skate at the 2011 and 2012 World Junior Championships.

Programs

Competitive highlights 
JGP: Junior Grand Prix

References

External links 

 
 Patricia Gleščič at Tracings

1994 births
Slovenian female single skaters
Living people
Sportspeople from Ljubljana